Mobarez (Persian: مبارز; meaning "Warrior")  is a domestically upgraded version of the British Chieftain tank by Iran.

Changes
The hull of the tank has been modified at the back and sides. The fuel tank has been replaced by a new, repairable one. Also, additional vibration damping systems have been added to protect sensitive electronic components. Other modifications include a laser range finder, a more powerful engine and the addition of light amplifying and infra-red systems.

The gearbox and suspension were changed, and an electrical generator was also added.

Production
Iran upgrades its Chieftain tanks in Shahid Kolahduz Industrial Complex along with its T-72 tanks.

Operators

See also
 Iranian military industry

References

Main battle tanks of Iran
Post–Cold War main battle tanks
Military vehicles introduced in the 2000s